Ngapa is a village in Mueda District, in Cabo Delgado Province of northern Mozambique.

Notes

External links
"Ngapa Map — Satellite Images of Ngapa" Maplandia World Gazetteer

Populated places in Cabo Delgado Province